is a subway station on the  Fukuoka City Subway Nanakuma Line in Chūō-ku, Fukuoka in Japan. Sakurazuka is literally "cherry blossom slope" in Japanese. So its station symbol is a picture of seven cherry blossom petals in pink is fluttering in the wind.

Lines

Platforms

Vicinity
7-Eleven
Sakurazaka Post Office
La Palate Supermarkets
Sakurazaka Central Hospital
Church of St Martin
Hakata Church
Taisei Junior and Senior High School
Blood Research Institute
Taipei Economic and Cultural Representative Office Fukuoka branch office
Chikushi Jogakuen Girl's High School 
Fukuoka Yamano-ue Hotel

History
February 3, 2005: Opening of the station

References

Railway stations in Japan opened in 2005
Railway stations in Fukuoka Prefecture
Nanakuma Line